CCGS Cygnus is a  fisheries patrol vessel of the Canadian Coast Guard. The ship entered service in 1981 and is used to monitor the fisheries along the Atlantic coast of Canada. During the Turbot War, Cygnus was among the Coast Guard vessels sent to monitor the European fishing fleet on the Grand Banks.

Design and description
The ship is propelled by two Polar Nohab F212V 12-cylinder geared diesel engines driving one controllable pitch propeller and bow thrusters creating . The vessel is equipped with one Caterpillar 3304 emergency generator.

The vessel is equipped with a flight deck located over the stern of the ship and can operate one light helicopter of the MBB Bo 105 or Bell 206L types. Unlike sister ship , Cygnus was not built with a hangar. The patrol vessel is armed with two  machine guns. The ship has a complement of 19, with 8 officers and 11 crew. The vessel has 23 spare berths.

Service history
The ship was constructed by Marystown Shipyard at their yard in Marystown, Newfoundland and Labrador with the yard number 30. Named for the constellation in the northern hemisphere, the patrol vessel was commissioned in May 1981. Cygnus is registered in Ottawa, Ontario and was initially assigned to the Coast Guard base at Dartmouth, Nova Scotia. The vessel later transferred to her current homeport at St. John's, Newfoundland and Labrador.

Cygnus is used primarily for patrolling the Atlantic Canada fisheries and coast, especially the Grand Banks of Newfoundland. In 1994, Canada and the European Union got into a dispute over fishing rights in Canadian waters with the two parties disagreeing over which party could set limits on catches. In June, during the height of what became known as the Turbot War, Cygnus was among the Coast Guard vessels deployed to monitor the European fishing fleet on the Grand Banks. In 2014, the patrol vessel underwent a $1.2 million refit by St. John's Dockyard in St. John's focusing on renewing the steel of the ship. On 9 February 2018, Cygnus returned to St. John's to undergo emergency repairs after the ship began taking on water through a leak around the propeller shaft. Cygnus was escorted to port by the offshore supply vessel Atlantic Kingfisher and the Coast Guard ship .

In February 2022, Cygnus was dispatched to search for survivors of the sunken fishing trawler Villa de Pitanxo off the coast of Newfoundland and Labrador. There were three survivors and a further nine bodies recovered with twelve people missing before the search was called off due to inclement weather.

References

Notes

Citations

Sources
 
 
 
 

Cape Roger-class patrol vessels
Ships built in Newfoundland and Labrador
1981 ships
Patrol vessels of the Canadian Coast Guard